The following is a list of space races, that is, competitions or rivalries in going into outer space.

List

Rivalries and political competitions
 Space Race, the Cold War geopolitical rivalry between the United States and the Soviet Union in space primacy
 Moon Race, the race to have the first human landing on the Moon
 Mars race, the rivalry between teams to put the first humans on or about the planet Mars
 Billionaire space race, the entrepreneurial rivalry for private spaceflight dominance mainly between Jeff Bezos, Richard Branson, and Elon Musk.

Contract competitions
 Amerikabomber contract competition in WWII Nazi Germany Luftwaffe for a space bomber capable of striking the United States from Germany

Prize competitions
 Ansari X Prize, the first X Prize Foundation prize for achieving repeated suborbital spaceflights using a space tourism capable vehicle, which was won by the SpaceShipOne team of Mojave Aerospace Ventures composed of Scaled Composites, Burt Rutan, Paul Allen and Vulcan Inc.
 Google Lunar X Prize, the X Prize Foundation prize sponsored by Google to put a robotic rover onto the Moon, won by no team
 America's Space Prize, the Bigelow Aerospace sponsored prize to create an American orbital space tourism capable vehicle, won by no team

See also
 Space competition
 NASA Centennial Challenges
 List of vehicle speed records — for literal speed records of space vessels
 List of spaceflight records — for literal speed records of spacecraft

External links
  — a literal spacecraft speed comparison, instead of the metaphorical races for outer space, listed above.

Space lists
Lists of competitions
Technological races